Lovesickness refers to an affliction that can produce negative feelings when deeply in love, during the absence of a loved one or when love is unrequited.

The term "lovesickness" is rarely used in modern medicine and psychology, though new research is emerging on the impact of heartbreak on the body and mind.

History 

In the medical texts of ancient Greece and Rome, lovesickness was characterized as a "depressive" disease, "typified by sadness, insomnia, despondency, dejection, physical debility, and blinking." In Hippocratic texts, "love melancholy" is expected as a result of passionate love. Lovesickness could be cured through the acquisition of the person of interest, such as in the case of Prince Antiochus.

In ancient literature, however, lovesickness manifested itself in "violent and manic" behavior. In ancient Greece, Euripides' play Medea portrays Medea's descent into "violence and mania" as a result of her lovesickness for Jason; meanwhile, in ancient Rome, Virgil's Dido has a manic reaction to the betrayal of her lover, Aeneas, and commits suicide. Dido's case is especially interesting, as the cause of her lovesickness is attributed to the meddling of the gods Juno and Venus.

In the Middle Ages, unrequited love was considered "a trauma which, for the medieval melancholic, was difficult to relieve." Treatments included light therapy, rest, exposure to nature, and a diet of lamb, lettuce, fish, eggs, and ripe fruit.

In both antiquity and the Middle Ages, lovesickness was often explained by an imbalance in the humors. An excess of black bile, the humor  correlated with melancholy, was usually considered the cause.

Modern research 

In 1915, Sigmund Freud asked rhetorically, "Isn't what we mean by 'falling in love' a kind of sickness and craziness, an illusion, a blindness to what the loved person is really like?"

Scientific study on the topic of lovesickness has found that those in love experience a kind of high similar to that caused by illicit drugs such as cocaine. In the brain, certain neurotransmitters — phenethylamine, dopamine, norepinephrine and oxytocin — elicit the feeling of high from "love" or "falling in love" using twelve different regions of the brain. These neurotransmitters mimic the feeling of amphetamines.

On average, a psychologist does not get referrals from general practitioners mentioning "lovesickness", although this can be prevalent through the language of what the patient feels. With the common symptoms of lovesickness being related to other mental diseases, it is often misdiagnosed or it is found that with all the illnesses one could be facing, love is the underlying problem. This is incredibly dangerous when one does not seek help or cannot cope because love has been known to be fatal (a consequence of which might be attempted suicide, thus dramatising the ancient contention that love can be fatal).

In his book The Social Nature of Mental Illness, Len Bowers postulates that although physiological differences exist in the brains of those that are deemed "mentally ill", there are several other criteria that must be met before the differences can be called a malfunction.  It is possible, therefore, that many mental illnesses (such as lovesickness) will never bear strong enough evidence to clinically warrant "legitimate" affliction by clinical standards without further correspondingly parasympathetic criteria of established dysfunction(s).

Frank Tallis, a researcher of love and lovesickness, suggests in his 2005 article that lovesickness occurs when one is "truly, madly, deeply" in love and should be taken more seriously by medical professionals.

Tallis includes a list of common symptoms of lovesickness in the following: 
 Mania - an abnormally elevated mood or inflated self-esteem
 Depression, hopelessness, or helplessness
 Nausea
 Tearfulness
 Insomnia, which may lead to fatigue
 Lack of concentration
 Loss of appetite or overeating
 Stress
 Obsessive-compulsive disorder - preoccupation and hoarding valueless but superstitiously resonant items
 Dizziness and confusion
 Body tremors, intrusive thoughts, or frequent flashbacks
 Mood swings

According to Tallis, many symptoms of lovesickness can be categorized under the DSM-IV and the ICD-10. Obsessive-compulsive disorder (OCD) is a symptom of lovesickness because it includes a preoccupation. A further study conducted by Italian psychiatrist Donatella Marazitti found that people who were in the early romantic phase of a love relationship had their serotonin levels drop to levels found in patients with OCD. This level is significantly lower than that of an average or healthy person.

In the arts
William Shakespeare's Romeo and Juliet portrays the true madness of "love" and the grief that the two young, infatuated lovers feel. When Romeo finds his love dead (or so he believes), with the thought of living without his "true love", the grief and depression overcomes him and he takes his own life. Juliet, after waking and upon seeing his dead body, is also overcome with despair and takes her own life.

Gothic metal songs thematize lovesickness from Medieval literary influences. "This emotional and physical distress is a key element of fin'amor that echoes into Gothic metal", according to The Oxford Handbook of Music and Medievalism. "In particular, lovesickness was associated with desires and passions that remained unfulfilled, resulting in symptoms such as sleeplessness, sighing, and loss of appetite, all of which were considered manifestations of the mind's efforts to restrain its passions."

The lyrics to American R&B singer Bilal's song "Something to Hold on To" (from the album Love for Sale) are described as a plea to romantic devotion hastily written in a moment of lovesickness.

Bob Dylan's song "Love Sick," from his 1997 album Time Out of Mind, portrays the conflicting feelings (betrayal and intense love) that come with lovesickness: "I’m sick of love…I wish I’d never met you

I’m sick of love…I’m trying to forget you

Just don’t know what to do

I’d give anything to be with you"

See also
 Affectional bond
 Broken heart
 Hi-wa itck, a Mojave Indian syndrome triggered by separation of a loved one
 Limerence
 Lovestruck
Obsessive love
Triangular theory of love

References

Further reading
 
 
 
 

Emotion
Emotional issues
Love
Psychodynamics